The International Expo of Sport (Esposizione Internazionale dello Sport di Torino del 1955) was held in Turin, Italy, from 25 May to 19 June 1955. Recognised by the Bureau International des Expositions as a Specialised Expo, it focused on the theme "Sports", and welcomed 120,000 visitors. Delegates from eleven countries participated in the event, which was organised under the umbrella of the Italian National Olympic Committee (CONI).

See also 
 Prima Esposizione Internazionale d'Arte Decorativa Moderna (1902)
 Turin International (1911)
 Expo 61
 List of world's fairs

External links
Official website of the BIE

World's fairs in Turin
1950s in Turin
1955 festivals
1955 in Italy
1955 in Italian sport
Sports competitions in Turin
International sports competitions hosted by Italy